Qaleh Mansur may refer to:

Masur, Iran
Qaleh-ye Mansur